Salmir Kaplan (born 26 June 1981) is a Bosnian politician who is a current member of the Federal House of Representatives. He also served as the Federal Minister of Culture and Sports from 2011 until 2015.

References

1981 births
Living people
People from Stolac
Government ministers of Bosnia and Herzegovina
Bosniaks of Bosnia and Herzegovina
Bosnia and Herzegovina Muslims
Bosnia and Herzegovina politicians
Bosniak politicians
Party of Democratic Action politicians
Academic staff of the University of Sarajevo